Charles "Carl" Panzram (June 28, 1891 – September 5, 1930) was an American serial killer, spree killer, mass murderer, rapist, child molester, arsonist, robber, thief, and burglar. In prison confessions and in his autobiography, Panzram confessed to having committed twenty-one murders, only five of which could be corroborated; he is suspected of having killed more than a hundred men in the United States alone, and several more in Portuguese Angola. He also confessed to having committed more than a thousand acts of rape against males of all ages. 

After a lifetime of crime, during which he served many prison terms and escaped from them just as much, Panzram was executed by hanging in 1930 for the murder of a prison employee at the United States Penitentiary in Leavenworth, Kansas.

Early life 
Carl Panzram was born on June 28, 1891, on a farm near East Grand Forks, Minnesota, the sixth of seven children born to East Prussian immigrants Johann "John" Gottlieb Panzram and Mathilda Elizabeth "Lizzie" Panzram (née Bolduan, anglicised as Boldon, Bolden, Boldwon, or Baldwin). 

Panzram and his six siblings were made to work on the farm from a young age until truancy laws, which made it illegal for parents to not send their children to school, came into effect. Panzram's parents were not happy to have their children sent to school during the day and forced them to work in the fields throughout the night instead; Panzram later reported he would get just two hours of sleep before he would have to get up for school. Punishments in the home ranged from being chained to being starved. 

Panzram reflected on his early childhood with the sentiment that he was not liked by other children; by the age of five or six he was a liar and thief, and he recalled that he became meaner the older he grew. He also claimed that his parents had a lobotomy operation performed on him when he was very young. Panzram’s father abandoned the family when he was six or seven years old. Eventually, four of his five older brothers left as well; one of them died.

Early criminal record 

Panzram's run-ins with the law started early; in 1899, at age 8, he was charged in juvenile court with being drunk and disorderly, and in 1903, at age 11, he was arrested and jailed for being drunk and "incorrigible," a term used when detaining youths. Not long after this second arrest, Panzram stole some cake, apples, and a revolver from a neighbor's home. 

In October 1903, Panzram's mother sent him to the Minnesota State Training School, purportedly a reform school; Panzram later claimed in his autobiography, however, that he was repeatedly beaten, tortured and raped by staff members, in a workshop the children dubbed "the paint shop" due to leaving the room "painted" with bruises and blood. Panzram hated the school so much that he decided to burn it down, and did so successfully and without detection on July 7, 1905.

In January 1906, Panzram was paroled from Red Wing Training School, where he had been detained after stealing money from his mother's pocketbook. By his early teens Panzram exhibited alcoholism and had a lengthy criminal rap sheet, mostly for burglary and robbery offenses. 

At age 14, a couple of weeks after his parole and two weeks after attempting to kill a Lutheran cleric with a revolver, Panzram ran away from home to live on the streets. He often traveled via train cars, and later recalled having been gang raped by a group of homeless men on one of these occasions.

Crimes

Early crimes 
In the summer of 1906, Panzram was arrested for burglary in Butte, Montana, and sentenced to one year's imprisonment at Montana State Reform School in Miles City. He claimed that after a guard punished him, he assaulted and critically injured the man with a wooden board. As punishment, Panzram had to spend some time in solitary confinement. The following year, Panzram and a fellow named inmate James Benson escaped from Montana State Reform School and stole guns in Terry, Montana. In the coming weeks, Panzram and Benson left a trail of destruction along the U.S.-Canadian border as they repeatedly broke into stores and razed buildings, especially churches, to the ground with fire. In Fargo, North Dakota, the two men separated. 

Later in 1907, after getting drunk in a Helena, Montana, saloon, Panzram enlisted in the United States Army and was assigned to the 6th Infantry at Fort William Henry Harrison. Refusing to take orders from officers and being generally insubordinate, he was convicted of larceny for stealing $80 worth of supplies and served a prison sentence in the United States Disciplinary Barracks at Fort Leavenworth between 1908 and 1910, with U.S. Secretary of War William Howard Taft officially approving Panzram's sentence. Panzram later claimed that while he had been a rotten egg before imprisonment at the military pen, any shred of goodness left in him was smashed out during his Leavenworth stint.

After his release and dishonorable discharge, Panzram resumed his career as a thief. Stealing items that ranged from bicycles to yachts, he was caught and imprisoned multiple times. He served prison sentences both under his own name and various aliases in: Fresno, California; Rusk, Texas; The Dalles, Oregon; Harrison, Idaho; Butte, Montana; Montana State Prison (as "Jeff Davis" #4194 #3194 and "Jefferson Rhodes" #4396); Oregon State Prison ("Jefferson Baldwin" #7390); Bridgeport, Connecticut ("John O'Leary"); Sing Sing Correctional Facility, New York ("John O'Leary" #75182); Clinton Correctional Facility, New York ("John O'Leary" #75182); and Washington, D.C. (Carl Panzram #33379) and Leavenworth, Kansas (Carl Panzram #31614). While incarcerated, Panzram frequently attacked guards and refused to follow their orders. The guards retaliated, subjecting him to beatings and other punishments.

In his autobiography, Panzram wrote that he was "rage personified" and that he would often rape men whom he had robbed. He was noted for his large stature and great physical strength—due to years of hard labor at Leavenworth and other prisons—which aided him in overpowering most men he attempted to; he also engaged in vandalism and arson. By his own admission, one of the few times he did not engage in criminal activities was when he was employed as a strikebreaker against union employees. On one occasion, he tried to sign aboard as a ship's steward on an Army transport vessel but was discharged when he reported to work intoxicated.

Escalating violence 
Panzram claimed in his 1929 autobiography that after escaping from a chain gang sentence at Rusk, Texas, he went to Ciudad Juárez, Chihuahua, Mexico, in the winter of 1910 to try to enlist in the Federales. He later claimed to have abducted, assaulted, and strangled a man about a mile from town and then stolen $35 ($566.12 in 2021) from the victim.

In the summer of 1911, Panzram, going by the alias "Jefferson Davis", was arrested in Fresno, California, for stealing a bicycle. He was sentenced to six months in county jail, but escaped after thirty days. Panzram later claimed that after his escape, while riding on a boxcar in California, he disarmed an armed man he either called a "railway detective" or a "railway brakeman", whom he then forced to rape a homeless man at gunpoint, before throwing both of them off the train. He proceeded to Oregon, where he made a living as a logger. 

Panzram admitted years later that once, when hiding in a bordello, his wallet was stolen and he was infected with gonorrhea; he also became paranoid, claiming throughout his western crime sprees that the police were always on his trail but could never catch him. In 1913, Panzram, going by the alias "Jack Allen", was arrested in The Dalles, Oregon, for highway robbery, assault, and sodomy. He broke out of jail after two or three months. He was later arrested in Harrison, Idaho, but again he escaped from county jail. He was again arrested in Chinook, Montana, and sentenced to one year in prison for burglary, to be served at the Montana State Prison.

On April 27, 1913, Panzram, using his "Jefferson Davis" alias, was admitted to the state prison at Deer Lodge, Montana. He escaped on November 13. Within a week, he was arrested for burglary in Three Forks, giving his name as "Jeff Rhoades". He was incarcerated at Deer Lodge for an additional year. By his own account he committed sodomy while imprisoned. 

Panzram was released on March 3, 1915, with a new suit of clothing, $5.00 and a ticket to the next town six miles away. He rode the rails though Washington, Idaho, Nebraska and South Dakota via the Columbia River. On June 1 he burglarized a house in Astoria, Oregon, where he was soon arrested while attempting to sell some of the stolen items.

Under the name "Jeff Baldwin", Panzram was sentenced to seven years in prison, to be served at the Oregon State Penitentiary in Salem, where he was taken on June 24, 1915. Warden Harry Minto believed in harsh treatment of inmates, including beatings and isolation, among other disciplinary measures. Later, Panzram stated that he swore he "would never do that seven years and I defied the warden and all his officers to make me."

Later that year, Panzram helped fellow inmate Otto Hooker escape from the prison. While attempting to evade recapture, Hooker killed Minto. This event marked Panzram's first known involvement in a murder, as an accessory before the fact. In his prison record which noted his two alias "Jefferson Davis" and "Jeff Rhodes" he falsely gave his age as 30, and his place of birth as Alabama. His only truthful statement was when he stated his occupation as "thief".

Panzram was disciplined several times while at Salem, including 61 days in solitary confinement, before escaping on September 18, 1917. After two shootouts, in which he attempted to shoot Chief Deputy Sheriff Joseph Frum, he was recaptured and returned to the prison. On May 12, 1918, he escaped again by sawing through the bars of his cell, and caught a freight train heading east. He began going by the name "John O'Leary" and shaved off his mustache to change his appearance. Panzram would never return to the Northwest. 

Panzram allegedly ended up in New York City and got a Seaman Identification card; and sailed on the steamship James S. Whitney to Panama. There he tried to steal a small boat with the help of a drunken sailor, who killed everyone on board and was arrested. Still free, Panzram travelled to Peru to work in a copper mine. After that, he traveled to Chile, Port Arthur, Texas, London, Edinburgh, Paris, and Hamburg.

Murder spree 
In 1920, Panzram committed a robbery in Newport, Rhode Island. On September 16 of that year he burglarized the William H. Taft Mansion in New Haven, Connecticut, a residence of William Howard Taft, by that time a former President. Panzram specifically targeted the mansion out of animus he had been holding against Taft since his incarceration at Fort Leavenworth. He stole a large amount of jewelry and bonds, as well as Taft's Colt M1911 .45-caliber handgun.

Using Taft's stolen money, Panzram bought a small sailing yacht, the Akista, and embarked on an eight-year long murder spree which spanned several countries and involved multiple victims. Sailing south to New York City, for three months Panzram lured sailors away from port bars onto the yacht, made them drunk before raping them, and then murdered the men with Taft's stolen pistol, subsequently dumping their bodies near Execution Rocks Light in Long Island Sound. In this manner Panzram claimed to have killed ten men. The sailor murders ended only after Akista ran aground and sank near Atlantic City, New Jersey, during which his last two potential victims escaped to parts unknown. On October 26, Panzram was arrested in Stamford, Connecticut, for burglary and possession of a loaded handgun. In 1921, he served six months in jail in Bridgeport, Connecticut.

Panzram caught a ship to Southern Africa and landed in Luanda, the capital of colonial Portuguese Angola. In 1921, Panzram was foreman of an oil rig in Angola; he later burned it down out of what he said was spitefulness. Shortly after, he decided to seek out a virgin girl. Panzram paid a resident Angola family 80 eschudas (US$8.00) and, in exchange, was given an 11- or 12-year-old girl, whom he raped in his shack later that night; he returned the girl to her family demanding his money back on suspicion of the girl not being a virgin. The family then gave Panzram an 8-year-old girl, whom he also raped in his shack, but was eventually taken back to the family because he suspected that she too was not a virgin. He later claimed that he raped and killed an Angolan boy estimated to be 11 or 12 years old. In his confession to this murder, he wrote: "His brains were coming out of his ears when I left him and he will never be any deader." He also claimed that he hired a boat with six rowers, shot the rowers with a Luger pistol, and threw their bodies to the crocodiles.

After his return to the United States, Panzram asserted he raped and killed two small boys, beating one to death with a rock on July 18, 1922, in Salem, Massachusetts, and strangling the other later that year near New Haven.

After his murder spree in Salem, Panzram worked as a night watchman in Yonkers, New York, north of Manhattan, at Abeeco Mill factory. In Providence, he stole a yawl and sailed to New Haven, seeking victims to rob and rape, and boats to steal. In June 1923, in New Rochelle, New York, he stole a yacht belonging to the police chief of New Rochelle. He picked up a 15-year-old boy named George Walosin and promised him a job on the boat, but instead, sodomized him.

On June 27, on the river near Kingston, New York, Panzram claimed he picked a man up but then believing the man was going to attempt to rob him, Panzram used a .38 caliber pistol from the stolen yacht to kill the John Doe victim. Panzram threw the body into the river. On June 28, Panzram and Walosin docked at Poughkeepsie, New York. Panzram stole $1,000 worth of fishing nets. At Newburgh, New York, Walosin, having witnessed the murder the day before, jumped overboard and swam to shore. He reported to the police at Yonkers that he had been sexually assaulted by Panzram. An alert went out for "Captain John O'Leary". On June 29, "John O'Leary" was arrested in Nyack, New York.

On July 9, Panzram tried to escape from jail. He later conned his lawyer by giving him ownership of a stolen boat in return for bail money. Panzram skipped bail, and the boat was confiscated by the government agents. On August 26, "O'Leary" was arrested in Larchmont, New York, after breaking into a train depot. Three days later, on August 29, "O'Leary" was cleared as a suspect in the stabbing death of Dorothy Kaufman of Greenburgh, New York, committed a month prior. He was sentenced to five years' imprisonment. While in county jail, he confessed to the alias "Jeff Baldwin", and that he was wanted in Oregon for murder of a policeman (Minto). After first being imprisoned in Sing Sing Prison, in October, Panzram was imprisoned at Clinton Prison in Dannemora, New York as Inmate #75182. While there he tried to escape but ended up with a injured spine and broken ankles. He was discharged in July 1928, and he allegedly committed a murder that summer in Baltimore, Maryland.

Capture and execution 
On August 30, 1928, Panzram was arrested in Baltimore for a Washington, D.C. burglary – stealing a radio and jewelry from the home of a dentist on August 20. 3 men were also arrested as accomplices and most of the jewelry was recovered. Panzram gave his correct name although he lied by claiming his age as 41 and that he was from Nevada. During his interrogation, he confessed to killing three young boys earlier that month – one in Salem, one in Connecticut, and a 14-year-old newsboy in Philadelphia. Panzram's confession to killing a boy at Pier 28 on League island near Philadelphia in August 1928 was confirmed. Boston police were unable to corroborate his other confession, the murder of a boy in Charlestown, Massachusetts. Panzram later wrote that he had contemplated mass murders and other acts of mayhem, such as poisoning a city's water supply with arsenic, or scuttling a British warship in New York Harbor to provoke a war between the United States and Britain.

In light of his extensive criminal record, Panzram was sentenced to 25-years-to-life. Upon arriving at Leavenworth Federal Penitentiary, identified as inmate #31614, he warned the warden, "I'll kill the first man that bothers me". Because he was considered too psychotic he was assigned to work alone in the prison laundry room, where the foreman, Robert Warnke, was known to bully and harass other prisoners under him. Warnke soon antagonized Panzram, despite the latter repeatedly warning him to back off. On June 20, 1929, Panzram beat Warnke to death with an iron bar. He was convicted and sentenced to death. He refused to allow any appeals of his sentence. In response to offers from death penalty opponents and human rights activists to intervene, he wrote, "The only thanks you and your kind will ever get from me for your efforts on my behalf is that I wish you all had one neck and that I had my hands on it."

While on death row, Panzram was befriended by an officer named Henry Philip Lesser, who would give him money to buy cigarettes. Panzram was so astonished by this act of kindness that, after Lesser provided him with writing materials, Panzram wrote a detailed summary of his crimes and nihilistic philosophy while awaiting execution. Panzram explicitly denied having any remorse for any of his actions and began his journal with the statement that, "In my lifetime I have murdered 21 human beings, I have committed thousands of burglaries, robberies, larcenies, arsons and, last but not least, I have committed sodomy on more than 1,000 male human beings. For all these things I am not in the least bit sorry."

Panzram was hanged on September 5, 1930. As officers attempted to place a customary black hood over his head, he spat in the executioner's face. When asked for any last words, he responded, "Yes. Hurry it up, you Hoosier bastard; I could kill a dozen men while you're screwing around!" He was buried in the Leavenworth Penitentiary Cemetery, where his grave is marked only with his prison number, 31614.

Legacy 
In 1938, Karl Menninger wrote Man Against Himself. He included material about Panzram, referring to him as using the pen name of "John Smith," and identified him as prisoner No. 31614.

Former prison guard Henry Lesser preserved Panzram's letters and autobiographical manuscript. He spent the next four decades trying to have this material published. In 1980, Lesser donated Panzram's materials to San Diego State University, where they are housed as the "Carl Panzram papers" in the Malcolm A. Love Library.

Writers Thomas E. Gaddis and Joe Long jointly co-wrote Killer: A Journal of Murder (1970). They had consulted with Lesser, who let them draw from Panzram's manuscript for their work.

Musician Marilyn Manson in his song The Nobodies sings the lyric "Today I'm dirty, I want to be pretty / Tomorrow, I know I'm just dirt" which alludes to a Panzram quote

Films
The Yugoslav film Strangler vs. Strangler (Davitelj protiv davitelja) (1984), about an ostensible serial killer, opens with a quote from Panzram: "I wish you all had one neck and my hands were around it."

Virtuosity (1995) Panzram is one of the prototypes of SID 6.7

The German film Schramm also begins with a quote of Panzram: "Today I am dirty, but tomorrow I'll be just dirt."

The Gaddis-Long book was adapted as a drama film of the same name, released in 1996 and starring James Woods as Carl Panzram and Robert Sean Leonard as Henry Lesser.

Filmmaker John Borowski released a documentary, Carl Panzram: The Spirit of Hatred and Vengeance (2012).

See also 
 Capital punishment by the United States federal government
 List of people executed by the United States federal government
 List of serial killers in the United States
 List of serial killers by number of victims
 List of serial rapists

References

Notes

Footnotes

External links 

 
 
 
Mugshots of Carl Panzram in 1915 and 1928
Carl Panzram at Find a grave

1891 births
1930 deaths
20th-century American memoirists
20th-century executions by the United States federal government
20th-century executions of American people
American arsonists
American autobiographers
American escapees
American male criminals
American murderers of children
American people convicted of assault
American people convicted of burglary
American people convicted of murder
American people convicted of sodomy
American people of Prussian descent
American rapists
American mass murderers
American spree killers
Bisexual men
Burials in Kansas
Criminals from Minnesota
Escapees from Oregon detention
Executed American serial killers
Executed mass murderers
Executed spree killers
Executed people from Minnesota
LGBT memoirists
LGBT people from Minnesota
Male serial killers
Nihilists
People convicted of murder by the United States federal government
People executed by the United States federal government by hanging
People from East Grand Forks, Minnesota
Writers from Minnesota
Violence against men in North America